Alexander Island in the Kimberley region of Western Australia  is the area of land between the two arms of the Fitzroy River from where the river splits, about 10 kilometres south of Fitzroy Crossing, to where the arms merge about 80 kilometres south-west of Fitzroy Crossing.

References

Islands of the Kimberley (Western Australia)